Bicchieri is a surname. Notable people with the surname include:

 Cristina Bicchieri (born 1950), Italian-American philosopher
 Emilia Bicchieri (1238–1314), Italian Dominican nun
 Guala Bicchieri ( 1150–1227), Italian diplomat and cardinal

See also
 Bucchieri